Jean-Claude Milani (born 5 July 1959) is a Swiss former professional footballer who played as a goalkeeper.

Career
In 1978, Milani signed for Swiss side Servette, where he made 14 league appearances and scored 0 goals. On 13 June 1979, he debuted for Servette during a 4–1 loss to FC Basel. In 1988, Milani signed for Nantes in the French Ligue 1. Before the second half of 1988–89, he signed for Swiss club Neuchâtel Xamax.

References

External links
 

Living people
1959 births
Swiss men's footballers
Association football goalkeepers
Swiss Super League players
Ligue 1 players
Servette FC players
FC Lausanne-Sport players
FC Nantes players
Neuchâtel Xamax FCS players
Swiss expatriate footballers
Swiss expatriate sportspeople in France
Expatriate footballers in France